Count Alexander of Montenegro (1585? –1648?), also known as Şehzade Yahya (sometimes spelled Jachia or Jahja), was an impostor and a self-claimed pretender to the Ottoman throne who claimed to be the son of Sultan Murad III.

Biography

Background 
According to Yahya's own writings, when his brother, Mehmed III, became Sultan, he followed the Ottoman custom of executing all of his brothers (potential rival claimants to the Ottoman throne). Yahya's mother Empress Safiye Sultan was concerned that this could also eventually happen to him after the death of his father, so he was smuggled out of the empire, first to Greece, and then to present-day Bulgaria. He was then supposedly baptized at an Orthodox Christian monastery, where he lived for the next eight years of his life.

Battle for Ottoman throne 

Yahya's narrative then claims that eventually, Yahya's two older brothers died, but in 1603, since Yahya had escaped the country to avoid fratricide, his nephew  Ahmed I became the Ottoman sultan. Yahya believed that as the next oldest son of Murad III, he was next in line to be Ottoman Sultan and felt cheated out of his rightful destiny. He would dedicate the rest of his life to gaining the Ottoman throne. However, the standard Ottoman practice at the time for determining the succession was not birth order of sons; instead the Ottoman laws of succession to the throne stated that after the death of their father, the Ottoman princes would fight among themselves until one emerged triumphant.

From 1603 on, Yahya made frequent trips to northern and western Europe to gain support for his claim to the throne (visiting Florence, Madrid, Rome, Kraków, Antwerp, Prague, and other cities). At one point he managed to win the support of the Tatar Khan Shahin, and of the Cossacks as well. Between 1614 and 1617, he schemed with Serbian Orthodox Christian bishops in the Sanjak of Prizren and Western Roman Catholic bishops and leaders as part of his strategy to gain the Ottoman throne. A few years later, with the assistance of Russian and Ukrainian cossacks, he led a fleet of 130 ships and unsuccessfully attacked Constantinople. He died in 1648 or 1649 on the Montenegrin coast, where he was involved in a rebellion organized by the Roman Catholic bishops of Shkodër and Bar.

Family

Yahya married an Albanian noblewoman named Anna Caterina of Drisht, the daughter of Duke Peter, Count of Drisht, in the early 1630s, when Yahya started calling himself Duke of that region. Anna Caterina was supposedly descended from the national Albanian hero Skanderbeg. They had two children, Maurice (born 1635) and Elena (born 1638).

In popular culture 
In the TV series "Muhteşem Yüzyıl: Kösem" the count Alexander was played by Berk Cankat. In the series he calls Iskender or Alex (presubably diminutive of Alexander). In the series he is not a European count, but a janissary, then an agha. He fell in love with Kösem Sultan, Haseki and legal wife of Ahmed I, but she does not reciprocate his feelings and finally has him killed when he tries to usurp the throne from her sons.

References

Sources 
 
 
 
 
 
 , reprinted in 2013 by BiblioLife
 
 
 
 
 
 Dorothy M. Vaughan, Europe and the Turk: A Pattern of Alliances, 1350-1700, Liverpool, 1954, pp. 220–236 

Impostors
Pretenders to the Ottoman throne
Ottoman princes
Converts to Eastern Orthodoxy from Islam
1585 births
1649 deaths